The 2003 Philadelphia Wings season marked the team's seventeenth season of operation.

Regular season

Conference standings

Game log
Reference:

Roster
Reference:

See also
 Philadelphia Wings
 2003 NLL season

References

Philadelphia Wings seasons
Philadelphia Wings Season, 2003
Philadelphia Wings